Robert H. Roberts (June 5, 1837 – September 3, 1888) was an American politician from New York.

Life
Roberts was born in Nantglyn, Denbighshire, Wales. The family emigrated to the United States in 1839, and settled in Constableville, New York. He attended the common schools and Boonville High School. Then he became a carpenter and builder of oil tanks; and later a farmer and builder of canal boats, in Boonville.

He entered politics as a Republican, joined the Liberal Republicans in 1872, and afterwards became a Democrat. He was Supervisor of the Town of Boonville in 1874 and 1875; a member of the New York State Assembly (Oneida Co., 4th D.) in 1878; President of the Village of Boonville in 1880; and a member of the New York State Senate (22nd D.) in 1882 and 1883.

He was accidentally killed on September 3, 1888, at his boatyard in Boonville, Oneida County, New York, when a wooden block fell on him and broke his neck. He was buried at the Boonville Cemetery.

Sources
 Civil List and Constitutional History of the Colony and State of New York compiled by Edgar Albert Werner (1884; pg. 291 and 377)
 Sketches of the Members of the Legislatures in The Evening Journal Almanac (1883)
 EX-SENATOR ROBERTS KILLED in NYT on September 4, 1888

External links

1837 births
1888 deaths
Democratic Party New York (state) state senators
People from Boonville, New York
Democratic Party members of the New York State Assembly
Industrial accident deaths
Accidental deaths in New York (state)
Politicians from Denbighshire
People from Lewis County, New York
19th-century American politicians